Hutnik means metallurgist in Polish and Czech languages, and may refer to:
Hutnik Nowa Huta, a Polish football club
Hutnik Warszawa, a Polish football club 
Ondřej Hutník (born 1983), Czech Muay Thai kickboxer